The 1993 FIFA U-17 World Championship, the fifth edition of the tournament, was held in the cities of Tokyo, Hiroshima, Kyoto, Kobe, Nagoya, and Gifu City in Japan between 21 August and 4 September 1993. Players born after 1 August 1976 were allowed to participate in the tournament.

Venues

Qualified Teams

Squads

For the complete list of players, see 1993 FIFA U-17 World Championship squads.

Referees

Asia
  Shin-Ichiro Obata
  Omar Al-Mohanna
Africa
  Jean-Fidele Diramba
  Alhagi Faye
CONCACAF
  Benito Archundia
  Brian Hall

South America
  Javier Castrilli
  Salvador Imperatore
  John Toro Rendón
Europe
  Eric Blareau
  Sandor Piller
  José Pratas
  Anders Frisk

Group stage
All times are Japan Standard Time (UTC+9)

Group A

Group B

Group C

Group D

Knockout stage

Quarterfinals

Semifinals

Playoff for 3rd place

Final

Result

Goalscorers

Wilson Oruma of Nigeria won the Golden Shoe award for scoring six goals. In total, 107 goals were scored by 56 different players, with only one of them credited as own goal.

6 goals
 Wilson Oruma
5 goals
 Manuel Neira
 Nwankwo Kanu
 Peter Anosike
4 goals
 Sebastián Rozental
 Joseph Fameye
 Judah Cooks
3 goals
 Petr Ruman
 Daniel Addo
 Emmanuel Duah
 Essuman Dadzie
 Tomasz Kosztowniak
2 goals

 Andrés Grande
 Leonardo Biagini
 Jonathon Carter
 Paul Bilokapić
 Héctor Tapia
 Ricardo Ciciliano
 Edgar García
 Edgar Santa Cruz
 Festus Odini
 Ibrahim
 Maciej Terlecki
 Piotr Orliński
 Hassan Al-Otaibi
 Fayzal Arouri
 Pierre Venditti

1 goal

 Federico Domínguez
 Mauro Cantoro
 Rodrigo Vilariño
 David Ristevski
 Nick Bosevski
 Sebastian Naglieri
 Alejandro Osorio
 Yao Xia
 Yu Genwei
 Juan Madrid
 Libor Sionko
 Miroslav Rada
 Miroslav Vápeník
 Richard Spanik
 Zoltán Novota
 Daniel Armah
 Francesco Totti
 Hidetoshi Nakata
 Naoki Matsuda
 Yuzo Funakoshi
 Artur Andruszczak
 Artur Wichniarek
 Artur Wyczalkowski
 Jacek Magiera
 Mirosław Szymkowiak
 Mohamed Al-Enazi
 Jason Moore
 Steve Armas

Own goal
 Dante Poli (playing against Poland)

Final ranking

External links
FIFA U-17 World Championship Japan 1993, FIFA.com
FIFA Technical Report (Part 1) and (Part 2)

FIFA U-17 World Championship
FIFA U-17 World Championship
International association football competitions hosted by Japan
FIFA U-17 World Cup tournaments
August 1993 sports events in Asia
September 1993 sports events in Asia